The name Emily has been used for fourteen tropical cyclones worldwide, seven in the Atlantic Ocean, five in the Eastern Pacific Ocean, and two in the Southern Hemisphere.

In the Atlantic:
Hurricane Emily (1981) – crossed Bermuda
Hurricane Emily (1987) – caused considerable damage to Saint Vincent, Dominican Republic, and Bermuda
Hurricane Emily (1993) – came near Hatteras Island, North Carolina
Tropical Storm Emily (1999) – no threat to land, absorbed by Hurricane Cindy
Hurricane Emily (2005) – Category 5 hurricane, caused damage in Grenada, Quintana Roo, and Tamaulipas
Tropical Storm Emily (2011) – caused minor damage throughout the Caribbean
Tropical Storm Emily (2017) – made landfall in Tampa, Florida

In the Eastern Pacific:
Hurricane Emily (1963)
Hurricane Emily (1965)
Tropical Storm Emily (1969)
Hurricane Emily (1973)
Tropical Storm Emily (1977)

In the Southern Hemisphere:
 Tropical Depression Emily (1962) – short-lived storm, no threat to land
 Cyclone Emily (1972) – off Queensland, eight lives lost at sea

Atlantic hurricane set index articles
Pacific hurricane set index articles